Get Up, Stand Up! The Bob Marley Musical is a musical based on the life and music of Bob Marley written by Lee Hall.

Production history

West End premiere (2021-2023) 
The musical made its world premiere at the Lyric Theatre in London's West End on 20 October 2021, with previews from 1 October, starring Arinzé Kene as Bob Marley. The musical was originally due to open on 6 February 2021, but was postponed due to the ongoing COVID-19 pandemic.

In July 2020, it was announced that Clint Dyer had replaced Dominic Cooke as the production's director. The musical is choreographed by Shelley Maxwell, with set design by Chloe Lamford, costume design by Lisa Duncan, lighting design by Charles Balfour, sound design by Tony Gayle, sound effect design by Ben Grant and video design by Tal Yarden. Musical supervision and arrangements are by Phil Bateman, wigs, hair and make-up by Campbell Young, orchestration by Simon Hale, musical direction by Sean Green, and casting direction by Pippa Ailion.

The production was nominated for 4 Laurence Olivier Awards in 2022, including Best New Musical and Best Actor in a Musical for Kene.

In March 2022, Michael Duke took over the role of Bob Marley. Duke was previously the role’s alternate until Arinzé Kene’s departure.

On 4 August 2022, it was announced that the musical would make its final performance on 8 January 2023.

Cast and characters

Notable West End replacements 
 Bob Marley: Michael Duke (began March 2022), David Albury (began October 2022)
 Alternate Bob Marley: David Albury (began March 2022), Ivano Turco (began October 2022)
 Rita Marley: Cleopatra Rey (begins October 2022)

Musical numbers 

Act I
 Lively Up Yourself
 Could You Be Loved 
 Trench Town Rock 
 Duppy Conqueror 
 Is this Love 
 Small Axe 
 Stir it Up 
 Concrete Jungle 
 Talkin' Blues 
 Roots, Rock, Reggae 
 Turn Your Lights Down Low 
 Kinky Reggae 
 Rebel Music 
 I Shot the Sherriff 
 War 
 Jamming

Act II
 Exodus 
 Punky Reggae Party 
 Waiting in Vain 
 Running Away 
 Jamming 
 No Woman No Cry 
 So Much Things to Say 
 Redemption Song 
 Three Little Birds 
 One Love 
 Could you be Loved 
 Get Up, Stand Up

Awards and nominations

See also 

 One Love: The Bob Marley Musical another 2017 musical based on the life and music of Bob Marley, written by Kwame Kwei-Armah

References

External links 

 Official website

2021 musicals
Biographical musicals
Biographical plays about musicians
Cultural depictions of Bob Marley
Jukebox musicals
West End musicals